This article contains information about the literary events and publications of 1747.

Events
March 31 – Laurence Sterne preaches the Good Friday sermon at St Helen Stonegate; The Case of Elijah and the Widow of Zerephath is later printed and published.
April 9 – David Garrick becomes joint patentee and manager of the Drury Lane Theatre in London.
June 21 – Licensing Act transfers responsibility for pre-production censorship of plays in Britain from the Master of the Revels to the Lord Chamberlain and restricts serious drama to the patent theatres.
December 1 – Samuel Richardson's two-volume epistolary novel Clarissa, or, the History of a Young Lady ("by the Editor of Pamela") begins publication in London from his own print shop, dated 1748.
unknown date – The Załuski Library in Warsaw is opened to the public.

New books

Prose
William Blackstone (attributed) – The Pantheon 
Thomas Carte – A General History of England
Juan de Iriarte – Discurso sobre la imperfección de los diccionarios
Diego de Torres Villarroel – Desengaños razonables para sacudir el polvo del espanto
Denis Diderot – La Promenade du sceptique (completed; not published until 1830)
William Dunkin – Boetia
Thomas Edward – A Supplement to Mr. Warburton's Edition of Shakespear
Henry Fielding, as "John Trott Plaid" – The Jacobite's Journal (periodical)
Sarah Fielding – Familiar Letters Between the Principal Characters in David Simple (a defense against unauthorized continuations)
Samuel Foote – The Roman and English Comedy Consider'd
Hannah Glasse – The Art of Cookery
Madame de Graffigny – Letters from a Peruvian Woman
Henry Home, Lord Kames – Essays Upon Several Subjects Concerning British Antiquities
Samuel Johnson – The Plan of a Dictionary of the English Language
Charlotte Lennox – Poems
David Mallet – Amyntor and Theodora
William Mason – Musaeus: A monody to the memory of Pope (an imitation of Milton's Lycidas)
William Memoth, the younger – The Letters of Pliny the Consul
Josiah Ralph – A Miscellany
Samuel Richardson – Clarissa vol. i–ii
William Shakespeare – The Works of Shakespear (edited by William Warburton)
Tobias Smollett – Reproof
Joseph Spence – Polymetis
Voltaire – Zadig (in original form as Memnon)
Horace Walpole – A Letter to the Whigs
Joseph Warton – Ranelagh House
Thomas Warton – The Pleasures of Melancholy

Drama
John Cunningham – Love in a Mist
Samuel Foote – The Diversions of the Morning or, A Dish of Chocolate 
David Garrick – Miss in Her Teens
Christian Fürchtegott Gellert – Die zärtlichen Schwestern (The Affectionate Sisters)
Carlo Goldoni – The Venetian Twins (I due gemelli veneziani)
Benjamin Hoadly – The Suspicious Husband
Edward Moore – The Foundling
Takeda Izumo II, Miyoshi Shōraku and Namiki Senryū I – Yoshitsune Senbon Zakura (義経千本桜, Yoshitsune and the Thousand Cherry Trees, original version for bunraku puppet theatre)

Poetry

Philip Francis – A Poetical Translation of the Works of Horace
Lady Mary Wortley Montagu – Six Town Eclogues

Births
January 11 – François Alexandre Frédéric, duc de la Rochefoucauld-Liancourt, French economics writer (died 1827)
January 12 – Susanna Blamire, English dialect poet and songwriter (died 1794)
January 15 – John Aikin, English biographer, activist and physician (died 1822)
January 26 – Samuel Parr, English schoolmaster and writer, "the Whig Johnson" (died 1825)
January – William Seward, English man of letters (died 1799)
February 19 – John "Walking" Stewart, English traveller and philosopher (died 1822) 
March 10 – Iolo Morganwg, Welsh antiquarian, bookseller, poet and literary forger (died 1826)
September 30 – John Mastin, English memoirist, local historian and cleric (died 1829)
December 12 – Anna Seward, English poet (died 1809)
Unknown date
John Edwards (1747–1792), Welsh poet (died 1792)
Thomas Scott, English cleric and religious writer (died 1821)

Deaths
January 16 – Barthold Heinrich Brockes German poet (born 1680)
May 28 – Luc de Clapiers, marquis de Vauvenargues, essayist (born 1715)
August 
Charles Fleetwood, manager of Drury Lane Theatre (year of birth unknown)
Leonard Welsted, English poet (born 1688)
September 7 – Michel Maittaire, French classical scholar, bibliographer and grammarian (born 1668)
November 17 – Alain-René Le Sage, French novelist and playwright (born 1668)
November 21 – Robert Mylne, Scottish antiquarian and writer (born 1643)
November 22 – Joseph Trapp, poet, controversialist and translator (born 1679)
December 23 – Étienne-François Avisse, French dramatist (born 1694)

References

 
Years of the 18th century in literature